The Sydney Law Review is a peer-reviewed law journal established in 1953.

References

External links 
 
 SydLRev Online, Australasian Legal Information Institute

Australian law journals
Quarterly journals
English-language journals
Publications established in 1953